Sir Frederick Hindle (28 July 1877 – 23 April 1953) was a Liberal Party politician in the United Kingdom, who served as Member of Parliament (MP) for the Darwen constituency in Lancashire from 1923 to 1924.

Background
Hindle was born in Darwen, the son of Frederick George Hindle and Helen Moulden (Gillibrand) Hindle. He was educated at Charterhouse School and Owens College, Manchester. He married Alys Lawrence.

Political career
Hindle served as Mayor of Darwen from 1912–13. He was appointed an Alderman Lancashire County Council. He succeeded his father as prospective Liberal candidate for Darwen. He contested the Darwen seat at the 1918 general election against his father's nemesis, Sir John Rutherford. At that election, Rutherford was endorsed by the Coalition Government and Hindle's prospects of victory were undercut by the intervention of a Labour Party candidate. Despite these setbacks, he came within 1,000 vote of gaining the seat. Four years later at the 1922 general election, he again lost by a majority of less than 1,000 votes. He won the seat at the 1923 general election, but lost it at the 1924 general election, and did not stand for Parliament again.

Electoral record

References 

1877 births
1953 deaths
Members of Lancashire County Council
Liberal Party (UK) MPs for English constituencies
UK MPs 1923–1924
People educated at Charterhouse School
Alumni of the Victoria University of Manchester